Polygraph college No. 56 is an educational institution in Moscow. The College provides professional vocational education in the printing industry.

Training focuses on basic and advanced levels of primary and secondary education. At the end of college, graduates are awarded the qualification and level.

Departments

Sovkhoznaya ulitsa, 2 
Former Polygraph Lyceum No. 314 was created in September 1977. The school repeatedly changed its status. It has trained about 4.5 thousand professionals from 12 professions for the printing industry.

Poltavskaya ulitsa, 3 

Former vocational school No. 25 opened in 1931. In Moscow, the construction of the Publishing House "True" and for the preparation of printers created a factory school. In addition to training highly qualified graduates in the subdivision developed persistent tradition in the organization of extracurricular and leisure time educational work. The results of this work by numerous diplomas, and certificates of thanks received by students and staff.

Kirovogradskaya ulitsa, 23 
Former Vocational School No. 205 was created in 1987.

Velozavodskaya ulitsa, 8 
Velozavodskaya is one of the oldest schools in the capital. Its ancestor is the FZU school, founded in 1922. It was based on the First Obraztsova typography. In 1962, it was renamed Moscow city vocational school No. 3.

Educational activities
Polygraph college No. 56 carries out training programs:

Classes cover e-recruitment and layout, offset printing, binder, secretary, mechanic, publishing, printing and production, management, design (in printing); training of specialists.

In 2010, the college completed 70 years of professional education in Russia.

Other Moscow printing educational institutions 

Moscow Publishing and Printing College of Ivan Fyodorov
Moscow State University of Printing Arts

References

External links 
 Official website
 Information about the college
 Community in LiveJournal
 Blog in Blogger

Art schools in Russia
Universities and colleges in Moscow
Education in Moscow
1922 establishments in Russia
Educational institutions established in 1922